A One Day International (ODI) is a cricket match between two representative teams, each having ODI status, as determined by the International Cricket Council (ICC). The United States (U.S.) played its first ODI under the captaincy of Richard Staple at the Kennington Oval, London on September 10, 2004 against New Zealand in 2004 ICC Champions Trophy. The U.S. played a total of two matches during this tournament and lost both, failing to qualify for the semifinals. The U.S. gained ODI status 15 years later after finishing in the top four of the 2019 ICC World Cricket League Division Two, thus securing a place in the 2019–21 ICC Cricket World Cup League 2.

To date, 40 players have represented the United States in ODI matches.

Key

Player list
Statistics are correct as of 26 November 2022.

Notes

See also
 List of United States Twenty20 International cricketers

References

United States
ODI Cricketers